The Anglican Diocese of the South is a diocese of the Anglican Church in North America, encompassing 58 parishes, including 8 partner congregations, in the American states of Alabama, Arkansas, Georgia, Kentucky, Mississippi, Missouri, North Carolina, Tennessee and West Virginia. The state with most parishes is Georgia, with 23. The diocesan headquarters are located in Atlanta, Georgia. The Holy Cross Cathedral, in Loganville, Georgia, serves as the cathedral.

History
The Anglican Diocese of the South was created on June 9, 2010 as a new diocese of the Anglican Church in North America. Its first bishop is Foley Beach, consecrated on October 9, 2010, at the Church of the Apostles, in Atlanta, Georgia, by Archbishop Robert Duncan. Beach has been Rector and Pastor of the Holy Cross Anglican Church, in Loganville, since 2004.

On April 18, 2012, the Anglican Diocese of the South announced the temporary affiliation of T. J. Johnston, of the Anglican Mission in the Americas, as Assisting Bishop, a measure to "provide a temporary jurisdictional connection" at least for 180 days until the future of the AMiA clergy and parishes is clarified.

On June 21, 2014, Beach was elected the second Archbishop of the Anglican Church in North America, with his enthronement taking place on 9 October 2014. He remains as bishop of the Anglican Diocese of the South. Archbishop Beach called the Right Reverend Dr. Francis Lyons III as assisting bishop since 2014. The Reverend Canon Steven Saul served as the first Canon to the Ordinary for the diocese. Thereafter,  The Reverend Canon Greg Goebel served in the role and currently the Reverend Canon Sean George serves the role as Canon to the Ordinary.

References

External links
Anglican Diocese of the South Official Website

Dioceses of the Anglican Church in North America
Anglican dioceses established in the 21st century
Anglican realignment dioceses
Religion in the Southern United States
2010 establishments in Georgia (U.S. state)